Jean Glénisson (25 January 1921 – 9 October 2010) was a French historian, archivist and paleographer.

Career 
 Degree in literature at the Faculty of Arts of Poitiers, (1940)
 Studies at the École nationale des chartes
 Archivist paleographer (1946)
 Member of the École française de Rome (1946–1948)
 Curator at the Archives nationales (1950–1952), responsible for the Trésor des Chartes
 Head of the Archives of the French Equatorial Africa library in Brazzaville (1952–1957)
 Professor of historiography at the University of São Paulo in Brazil
 Chargé de conférences (1959–1963) then director of studies at the VIe section of the École pratique des hautes études (EPHE) (1963)
 Member of the International Committee of Latin paleography, successor of Jeanne Vielliard as director of the IRHT (1966–1992).

A text editor, historian of medieval administration, including papal but also from Aunis and Saintonge, Glénisson also supported the introduction of laboratory techniques and computer analysis in order to study manuscript books.

References 

20th-century French historians
French archivists
École Nationale des Chartes alumni
Corresponding members of the Académie des Inscriptions et Belles-Lettres
Academic staff of the École pratique des hautes études
Officiers of the Légion d'honneur
1921 births
2010 deaths
People from Charente-Maritime